Sem is a village in Tønsberg in Vestfold county, Norway.

Sem was a former municipality in Vestfold.  The parish of Sæm was established as a municipality January 1, 1838 (see formannskapsdistrikt). According to the 1835 census the municipality had a population of 3,590. On 1 January 1965 the district Stang with 126 inhabitants was incorporated into the former municipality of Borre. On 1 January 1988 the rest was incorporated into the municipality of Tønsberg. Prior to the merger Sem was about three times the size of Tønsberg, which had a population of 21,948. The village of Sem has a population of 1,981, of which 42 people live within the border of the neighboring municipality Stokke.  The village is situated five kilometers west of the city of Tønsberg.

Originally the municipality and the parish were named after the historic Sem Manor (Sem hovedgård). During  the Middle Ages, Sem Manor was a royal and feudal overlord residence at the site where Jarlsberg Manor is located today. King Harald Fairhair chose to install his son Bjorn Farmann as the master of the estate. It was here that Bjorn Farmann was killed by Eric Bloodaxe in 927.  In 1673, Peder Schumacher Griffenfeld took over the property which until then had belonged to the King of Denmark. Griffenfeldt named the farm Griffenfeldgård, but three years later it was renamed Jarlsberg Manor (Jarlsberg Hovedgård). In 1682 the buildings on Jarlsberg burned and new buildings of stone were built by the new owner, the Danish-Norwegian Field Marshal Wilhelm Gustav Wedel.

The name 
The municipality (originally the parish) is named after the old farm Sem (Norse Sæmr - a compressed form of *Sæheimr), since the first church was built there. The first element is sær m 'sea, water' (here the Tønsberg fjord), the last element is heimr m 'farm; home'.

References

External links
Jarlsberg Hovedgård 
Sem Church 

Former municipalities of Norway
Populated places established in 1838
1838 establishments in Norway
Populated places disestablished in 1988
Villages in Vestfold og Telemark
Tønsberg